The 2013 Grand Prix de Denain was the 55th edition of the Grand Prix de Denain cycle race and was held on 11 April 2013. The race started and finished in Denain. The race was won by Arnaud Démare.

General classification

References

2013
2013 in road cycling
2013 in French sport
April 2013 sports events in Europe